Ilce Fernando Barahona Castillo (born 27 September 1998) is a Honduran professional footballer who plays as a midfielder for Platense in the Honduran Liga Nacional.

Career 
Barahona is a youth product of Platense, having spent his whole life in his hometown Puerto Cortés. Barahona made his professional debut with Platense in a 2–1 Liga Nacional loss to C.D. Real Sociedad on 21 September 2014.

International career
Barahona made his senior debut with the Honduras national team in a friendly 1–1 tie Nicaragua on 11 October 2020.

References

External links
 

1998 births
Living people
People from Puerto Cortés
Honduran footballers
Honduras international footballers
Association football midfielders
Platense F.C. players
Liga Nacional de Fútbol Profesional de Honduras players